Jorge Leonardo Obregón Rojas (born 29 March 1997) is a Colombian footballer who plays as a forward for HNK Rijeka.

Career

Club career
Before the 2016 season, Obregón was sent on loan to Colombian second division side Llaneros.

Before the 2019 season, he signed for Deportivo Municipal in Peru.

Before the second half of 2019/20, he signed for Croatian club Varaždin.

After Varaždin got relegated from Prva HNL at the end of 2020–21 season, Rijeka signed him on 5 July 2021.

References

External links
 

Living people
1997 births
Colombian footballers
Colombian expatriate footballers
Colombia youth international footballers
Sportspeople from Cauca Department
Association football forwards
Independiente Santa Fe footballers
Deportivo Municipal footballers
Jaguares de Córdoba footballers
Real Cartagena footballers
Llaneros F.C. players
NK Varaždin players
HNK Rijeka players
Categoría Primera A players
Categoría Primera B players
Peruvian Primera División players
Croatian Football League players
Expatriate footballers in Peru
Expatriate footballers in Croatia
Colombian expatriate sportspeople in Peru